The Parkes Catalogue of Radio Sources, also known as the Parkes Southern Radio Source Catalog, consists of 8264 astronomical radio sources, mostly south of declination +27. The catalogue was mostly compiled by John Bolton and his colleagues for 20 years. Both the Molonglo 408-MHz survey and the 80-MHz Culgoora measurements of Slee et al have contributed to the usefulness of the catalogue. For now, the catalogue only contains sources originally found in the Parkes 2700-MHz survey. The catalogue contains radio sources that have a frequency range of 80 - 22,000 MHz.

Objects
 PKS 0521-365
 PKS 0637-752
 PKS 1209-51/52
 PKS 1302-102
 PKS 0548-322
 PKS 1727-21 (Kepler’s Supernova)
 PKS 2000-330
 PKS 2014-55
 PKS 2155-304
 PKS 2201+044
 PKS-2349-014
 PKS 2357+00 (PGC 1)

See also
Astronomical catalogues
List of astronomical catalogues

References 

Astronomical catalogues